Antonovca may refer to several places in Moldova:

Antonovca, a village in Prajila Commune, Floreşti district
Antonovca, a village in Copăceni Commune, Sîngerei district